Keith Arthur Bracey (3 May 1916 – 28 October 2010) was a New Zealand television reporter and host who with his goatee beard was one of Television New Zealand's most recognised figures.

Background
In 1966 he was the inaugural presenter for New Zealand's first daily current affairs show, Town and Around.

On 28 April 2006 at the age of 90 he was at TVNZ headquarters in Auckland to celebrate the 40th anniversary of Town and Around.

Television
Bracey had a fair amount of involvement with the crime fighting series, Police 5 that began in 1976. For ten years he fronted the show and he also produced and did research for it. He stayed with it until it was shut down in 1986. There was talk of a replacement show of a similar nature. His being removed from the show made the front page in the news. Also during the early 1980s he was part of a team that included John Hawkesby and Judy Bailey that started up and produced the Auckland regional magazine show Top Half.

During his career, he had an acting role, playing a druid leader on the television series Hercules: The Legendary Journeys in 1998.

Personal life
Bracey was married twice and at the time of his death, he was survived by three sons and daughter.

See also
 List of New Zealand television personalities

References

External links
 Town And Around Auckland Highlights

1916 births
2010 deaths
New Zealand reporters and correspondents
New Zealand television presenters
New Zealand television journalists